Dorcadion korbi is a species of beetle in the family Cerambycidae. It was described by Ludwig Ganglbauer in 1883. It is known from Spain.

See also 
Dorcadion

References

korbi
Beetles described in 1883